The Navajo Nation presidential election of 2010 was held on Tuesday, November 2, 2010. Ben Shelly won the election.

The general election was held between New Mexico State Senator Lynda Lovejoy and outgoing Navajo Nation Vice President Ben Shelly.

The primary election was held on August 3, 2010. Lynda Lovejoy won a plurality of the vote, becoming the first woman to do so. Ben Shelly came in second place. The primary election included nine other candidates. This was the first Navajo Nation presidential election in which both candidates, Lovejoy and Shelly, were residents of the Eastern part of the Navajo Nation.

Ben Shelly became the first Vice President of the Navajo Nation to be elected president. Had she been elected, Lynda Lovejoy would have become the first female president of the Navajo Nation.

Previously, during the 2006 presidential election Joe Shirley Jr. had been re-elected to a second term over challenger Lynda Lovejoy. On July 9, 2010, the Navajo Nation Supreme Court ruled that Shirley could not seek a third consecutive term as president.

Candidates

General election

 Lynda Lovejoy, of Crownpoint, New Mexico, New Mexico State Senator, District 22
 Earl Tulley, chosen as Lovejoy's running mate for Vice President on August 8, 2010, activist and administrator.

 Ben Shelly of Thoreau, New Mexico, Vice President of the Navajo Nation
 Rex Lee Jim, chosen as Shelly's running mate for Vice President on August 8, 2010.

Announced and defeated in primary

 Anthony Begay, of Mariano Lake, New Mexico, Mariano Lake Chapter President
 Donald Benally, of  Shiprock, New Mexico, Shiprock Chapter Vice-President
 Sharon Clahchischilliage, of Cudeii, New Mexico, Fmr. Navajo-Washington Office Director
 Rex Lee Jim, of Rock Point, Arizona Navajo Nation Council
 Arbin Mitchell, of Wide Ruins, Arizona, Executive Director of Navajo Nation Division of Community Development
 Daniel Peaches, of Kayenta, Arizona, Fmr. Kayenta Chapter Council Delegate, Kayenta Town Manager, Staff Assistant to Fmr. Chairman Peter MacDonald Sr.
 Jerry Todacheenie, of Shiprock, New Mexico, BHP Employee and member of Shiprock Fair Board
 D. Harrison Tsosie, of Dennehotso, Arizona, Navajo Nation Deputy Attorney General
 Dale Tsosie, of Lechee, Arizona, Navajo Citizen

Not Running

 Lawrence T. Morgan, of Pinedale, New Mexico, Navajo Nation council Speaker

Term limited

 Joe Shirley Jr., of Chinle, Arizona, incumbent President of the Navajo Nation

Primary election
State Senator Lynda Lovejoy, who unsuccessfully sought the presidency in 2006, easily defeated eleven other candidates with 17,137 votes, becoming the first woman to win a Navajo Nation presidential primary. Navajo Nation Vice President Ben Shelly came in second place and qualified for the general election with 7,763 votes. Donald Benally of Shiprock placed third followed by the rest of the candidates.

Voter turnout was relatively low, at just 43.84% of registered voters. An estimated 48,511 of the 110,645 registered voters participated in the primary election.

Polling

Primary Election polling

Results
With 109 of the 110 chapters reporting, Ben Shelly was ahead of Linda Lovejoy with 52.7% vs. 47.3% of all counted votes. Shelly claimed victory and promised voters in the Gorman Hall at the Window Rock Sports Center that "I will work with you. We will work together." Lovejoy demanded a recount.

References

External links
Ben Shelly & Rex Lee Jim official campaign
Lynda Lovejoy & Earl Tulley official campaign

Navajo Nation presidential
Navajo Nation elections